Slavko Janjušević (7 May 1941 – 6 October 2007) was a Croatian rower. He competed in the men's coxed pair event at the 1964 Summer Olympics.

References

1941 births
2007 deaths
Croatian male rowers
Olympic rowers of Yugoslavia
Rowers at the 1964 Summer Olympics
Sportspeople from Nikšić